Christian Iloanusi (born 3 November 1969) is a Nigerian wrestler. He competed in the men's freestyle 90 kg at the 1988 Summer Olympics.

References

1969 births
Living people
Nigerian male sport wrestlers
Olympic wrestlers of Nigeria
Wrestlers at the 1988 Summer Olympics
Place of birth missing (living people)
20th-century Nigerian people